In astrology, the acronical place is the position of a planet or other celestial body when it is directly opposite the Sun.  For instance, if a person's Sun is placed at 10 degrees Leo, the acronical place of the Sun would be 10 degrees Aquarius.  Therefore, any planet or celestial body crossing 10 degrees Aquarius by transition or progression would be crossing the Sun's acronical place.

The term acronical is taken from the Greek "akrónychos", meaning "at nightfall".

References

Technical factors of Western astrology